Gustav Lindström (born 20 October 1998) is a Swedish ice hockey defenceman for the Detroit Red Wings of the National Hockey League (NHL).

Playing career
Lindström was drafted by the Detroit Red Wings with the 38th overall pick in the 2017 NHL Entry Draft. On 25 May 2018, Lindström signed a three-year entry-level contract with the Red Wings. On 5 February 2020, Lindström was recalled by the Detroit Red Wings. Prior to being recalled, he posted five assists in 45 games for the Grand Rapids Griffins. He made his NHL debut the next day in a game against the Buffalo Sabres.

On 17 August 2020, Lindström agreed to return to former Swedish club, Almtuna IS of the Allsvenskan, on loan until the commencement of the delayed 2020–21 North American season.

On 26 July 2021, Lindström signed a two-year, $1.7 million contract extension with the Red Wings.

Personal life
Lindström's uncle is Marcus Ragnarsson, a defenceman who played nine seasons in the National Hockey League (NHL) for the San Jose Sharks and the Philadelphia Flyers. Gustav's cousin Jakob Ragnarsson also plays hockey and was drafted by the New York Rangers in the 2018 NHL Entry Draft.

Career statistics

Regular season and playoffs

International

Awards and honors

References

External links
 

1998 births
Living people
Almtuna IS players
Detroit Red Wings draft picks
Detroit Red Wings players
Frölunda HC players
Grand Rapids Griffins players
People from Heby Municipality
Swedish ice hockey defencemen
Sportspeople from Uppsala County